

The 2016 Sunderland City Council election took place on 5 May 2016 to elect one-third of the members of Sunderland City Council in England. This was on the same day as other local elections held across the United Kingdom.

Election results
The election saw Labour gain two seats, taking the Houghton and Copt Hill wards after incumbent Independent councillors chose not to stand for re-election. The Conservatives held the seats they were defending in Fulwell and St Michael's. The Liberal Democrats took a seat from Labour in Millfield.

This resulted in the following composition of the council:

Ward by ward results
Asterisk denotes incumbent councillor.

Barnes ward

Castle ward

Copt Hill ward 

†The incumbent Independent councillor Derrick Smith retired at this election, and none of UKIP, the Conservatives, or the Greens had stood when the seat was last contested. The swing shown is to the Labour candidate from the Independent.

Doxford ward

Fulwell ward

Hendon ward

Hetton ward 

†Swing away from Labour to the Conservatives, who had stood aside last time this seat was contested.

Houghton ward 

†The incumbent Independent councillor Sheila Ellis retired at this election, and neither UKIP, the Conservatives, or Mick Watson had stood when the seat was last contested. The swing shown is to the Labour candidate from the previous Independent.

Millfield ward

Pallion ward

Redhill ward

Ryhope ward

Sandhill ward

Shiney Row ward

Silksworth ward

Southwick ward

St Anne's ward

St Chad's ward

St Michael's ward

St Peter's ward

Washington Central ward

Washington East ward

Washington North ward

Washington South ward

Washington West ward

References

2016 English local elections
2016
21st century in Tyne and Wear